Thomas Stewart Lonsdale (21 September 1882 – 17 March 1973) was a football goalkeeper and centre half.

Career
Lonsdale played amateur football in Auckland, before joining Grimsby Town in 1908. He played 87 games in his five years at the club, leaving for West Ham United in October 1913 after Grimsby sold him to raise the funds to sign Willis Rippon. After a shaky start to his West Ham career he was dropped, later regaining his place at the beginning of December. On 14 January 1914, Lonsdale was reported missing. After he turned up, the board of directors fined him a week's wages and he was demoted to the reserve side. Lonsdale did not regain his first-team place until the end of February 1914, and that summer he was sold to Southend United, having kept goal for the "Hammers" in 21 Southern League games in 1913–14. During World War I he also served in the Football Battalion. From Southend he moved to Stalybridge Celtic and then joined Port Vale in June 1923. He made 31 Second Division appearances in 1923–24, beating off competition from Sidney Brown and Robert Radford. However he suffered a head injury in March 1924 and was released from his contract at The Old Recreation Ground in the summer.

Career statistics

References

Sportspeople from Bishop Auckland
Footballers from County Durham
English footballers
Association football goalkeepers
Association football wing halves
West Auckland Town F.C. players
Bishop Auckland F.C. players
Grimsby Town F.C. players
West Ham United F.C. players
Southend United F.C. players
Stalybridge Celtic F.C. players
Port Vale F.C. players
Southern Football League players
English Football League players
British Army personnel of World War I
Middlesex Regiment soldiers
1882 births
1973 deaths